The Irish League in season 1918–19 was suspended due to the First World War. A Belfast & District League was played instead by 6 teams, and Belfast Celtic won the championship after a play-off with Linfield ( Championship Playoff: Belfast Celtic-Linfield 1-0 ).

League standings

Results

References
Northern Ireland - List of final tables (RSSSF)

1918-19
1918–19 in European association football leagues
Irish